Frank and Ernest is an American comic strip created and illustrated by Bob Thaves and later Tom Thaves.  It debuted on November 6, 1972, and has since been published daily in over 1,200 newspapers.  The humor of the comic is based almost exclusively on wordplay and puns.

Regardless of the topic, everything related to the topic (background and phrases) is shown in a single frame in the daily strips. Frank and Ernest has a tradition of breaking new ground. It was the first strip to use digital coloring for its Sunday strips and the first strip in over 1,000 newspapers to list the creator's email address. 1997 was a ground-breaking year: first interactive comics based on strips published in the newspaper, first keyword searchable archive for a comic strip and the first 3-D characters.

The strip is distributed to Spanish-speaking countries as Justo y Franco.

Characters and story
In a non-sequential story, the main characters are seen not just as humans but as animals, vegetables, minerals and more. A constant element has been word play, including the characters' names. Frank is both a name and a synonym for honest. The name Ernest is a homophone of the word earnest, which is a synonym for serious. Weekday strips are laid out in one long panel with one joke or pun; the Sunday strip is similarly in one large block, with a series of rapid-fire puns pertaining to the characters (usually in character as various characters including, but not limited to, the planets, "Robotics Department," or "Malaprop Man"). Example: U.S. Postal Dept. Stamp Design Office: "The department decided to have a religious message on our next stamp. How about: 'Lord, deliver us'?"

Unlike most syndicated comic strip cartoonists, Bob Thaves did not write all of the gags for the strip (nor maintain a pretense that he did) and openly solicited gags in publications such as Writer's Market. Bob Thaves died on August 1, 2006. His son, Tom Thaves, has since taken over production of the strip.

Awards
Thaves won the National Cartoonists Society's Newspaper Panel Cartoon Award for 1983, 1984, and 1986 for his work on the strip.  Other awards include the Mencken Award for Free Speech and designation as a Champion of Creativity by the American Creativity Association in 2006.

References

External links
Official site
Frank and Ernest at gocomics.com
 Justo y Franco at GoComics
Frank and Ernest at Don Markstein's Toonopedia. Archived from the original on July 30, 2016.
NCS Awards

1972 comics debuts
American comics characters
American comic strips
Comics characters introduced in 1972
Comic strip duos
Gag-a-day comics
Gag cartoon comics